Juvenal Loureiro Cardoso Airport  is the airport serving Pato Branco, Brazil.
 
It is operated by the Municipality of Pato Branco under the supervision of Aeroportos do Paraná (SEIL).

History
The city had received commercial flights from Azul Brazilian Airlines since January 10, 2019, when a weekly service to the airport from Curitiba was started, turning into a semi-daily service, with flights from Monday through Friday. However, the airline temporarily stopped the service on March 23, 2020 due to the COVID-19 pandemic, predicting the service would resume in late June, but the flight to the airport was actually resumed in late December 2021, again with a weekly service. A frequent itinerary was resumed in April 2022, with flights every day of the week except Saturday.

Airlines and destinations

Access

See also

List of airports in Brazil

References

External links

Airports in Paraná (state)
Pato Branco